Emma Davies may refer to:

Emma Davies (actress) (born 1970), English actress
Emma Davies (cyclist) (born 1978), British Olympic cyclist

See also
Emma Davis (born 1986), Irish Olympic triathlete